Ophiocordycipitaceae is a family of parasitic fungi in the Ascomycota, class Sordariomycetes. It was updated in 2020.

Genera
As accepted in 2020; (with number of species)

Drechmeria  (12)
Hantamomyces  (1)

Harposporium  (37) (Anamorphic)
Hirsutella  (50+)
Hymenostilbe  (12)
Ophiocordyceps  (263)
Paraisaria  (11)
Perennicordyceps  (4)
Pleurocordyceps  (10)
Polycephalomyces  (18)
Purpureocillium  (5)

Tolypocladium  (47) (Anamorphic)

Fossil species
†Paleoophiocordyceps

See also
Cordycipitaceae
Cordyceps

References

External links

 
Ascomycota families